Roman Aleksandrovich Martynyuk (born 13 April 1987) is a Russian volleyball player. He was a part of the Russia men's national volleyball team. On club level he plays for VC Lokomotiv Novosibirsk.

References

External links
profile at FIVB.org

National team
 2019  FIVB Nations League

1987 births
Living people
Russian men's volleyball players
Place of birth missing (living people)
Universiade medalists in volleyball
VC Belogorie players
Universiade gold medalists for Russia
Medalists at the 2011 Summer Universiade
20th-century Russian people
21st-century Russian people